Witold Małcużyński (August 10, 1914July 17, 1977) was a distinguished Polish pianist who specialized in the works of Frédéric Chopin. His playing was marked by great passion and poetry.

Biography
Małcużyński was born in 1914.  He was the older brother of Karol Małcużyński, a Polish politician and journalist.  He began playing piano at the age of 5, starting regular lessons four years later. Originally, he intended to study law but his innate love of music overcame his initial decision and he switched to music and enrolled at the Warsaw Conservatory from which he graduated with high honours, studying under Józef Turczyński. In 1936, he received an invitation to study under Marguerite Long and Isidor Philipp in Paris. He won the third prize at the III International Chopin Piano Competition in Warsaw in 1937. At the same time, he met his future wife, the French pianist Colette Gaveau.

When World War II began, he was in France. There, he joined the artistic-propaganda section of the Polish Army and visited military camps. After the capitulation of France, he and his new wife escaped in a sealed traincar to Portugal, where he met the conductor Grzegorz Fitelberg, who offered him a tour of South America. Małcużyński went to Argentina in October 1940. In April 1942 he relocated to the United States. Essential to his American career was the violinist Yehudi Menuhin, who initially helped him with management issues. After the war, he moved to Switzerland.

He was a member of the jury of the International Chopin Competition in 1960 and 1970, the Queen Elisabeth Music Competition (Belgium) in 1960, and the Paloma O'Shea International Piano Competition in 1976.

He was conferred an Officer's Cross of the Order of Polonia Restituta. He died in 1977 in Majorca, Spain, and was buried in the Powązki Cemetery, Poland.

Selected discography (CD)
 1989 Witold Małcużyński Plays Chopin (Polskie Nagrania)
 1993 Witold Małcużyński -  Fantasies-Nocturnes-Scherzos (Allegro Corporation)
 1993 Malcuzynski Plays Chopin - Grand Polonaise, Volume 2 (Allegro Corporation)
 1994 Malcuzynski: Artist Profile (Chopin: Piano Concerto No. 2/Piano Sonata No. 3/Waltzes/Mazurkas) (EMI Classic)
 1999 Witold Małcuzynski - Chopin-Rachmaninov (Dante)
 2000 Witold Malcuzynski Plays Chopin, Liszt and Szymanowski (Piano Masters) (Pearl)
 2001 Witold Malcuzynski - Brahms-Beethoven-Chopin  (Aura Classics)
 2001 Witold Malcuzynski Plays Great Romantic Piano Music (2CD) (Royal Long Players)
 2003 Witold Małcużyński Brahms-Franck-Bach-Busoni  (Polskie Nagrania)
 2006 Witold Małcużyński - Johannes Brahms Piano Concerto No.1 in D minor op.15 (Polskie Nagrania)
 2007 Witold Małcużyński - Chopin: Piano Concerto No. 2; Rachmaninov: Piano Concerto No. 3 (nagr. 1946-1949) (Guild)
 2007 Witold Malcuzynski Intermezzo (Fabula Classica)
 2010 Witold Małcużyński - Chopin (digipack) (Polskie Radio)

References

Sources
 Roger Hauert & Bernard Gavoty. "Malcuzynski", Great Concert Artists Series, Kister, Genève, 1957.
 Skarbowski, Jerzy. "Witold Małcużyński - pianista potężny", Poradnik Muzyczny, n° 7/8, 1989.
 
 Jeżewski, Krzysztof. "Witold Małcużyński - W trzydziestą rocznicę śmierci", Głos Katolicki, n° 26, Paris, 15-22.7.2007
 Narodowy Instytut Fryderyka Chopina - Witold Małcużyński

External links

 http://malcuzynski.galeon.com/

Polish classical pianists
Male classical pianists
1914 births
1977 deaths
Chopin University of Music alumni
Polish expatriates in Switzerland
Prize-winners of the International Chopin Piano Competition
Burials at Powązki Cemetery
20th-century classical pianists
20th-century composers
20th-century male musicians
Polish expatriates in the United States